Days in Europa is the second album by Scottish punk rock and new wave band Skids. It was released in 1979 by record label Virgin.

Writing 

Track #3 on Side 1 is 'Dulce et Decorum Est (Pro Patria Mori)'. A rough translation is "It is a sweet and glorious thing (to die for one's country)". Dulce et Decorum Est is a poem by Wilfred Owen.

Track #3 on Side 2 is Thanatos, the Greek word for "death" and the name of the ancient Greek god of death. It is used in Freudian psychology to refer to the death wish/destructive urge, as opposed to Eros, the reproductive urge.

The album features lyrical references to both World War I and World War II.

Release 

Days in Europa was released in 1979.

Reception 

Days in Europa has received a generally mixed response from critics. Ira Robbins of Trouser Press wrote "In polishing and refining the band's sound even a little, [producer Bill Nelson] smoothed off the vital edge."

Album cover controversy 

The album was initially released with an Aryan album cover reminiscent of the 1936 Olympics, complete with Germanic Gothic-style lettering. The album was re-released the following year with a new cover. At the same time the opportunity was taken to change the album's track listing and re-mix some of the original songs, allegedly for the US market. Some of the original tracks resurfaced on later albums.

The second release's cover includes the controversial first cover as a picture on the wall behind the woman in white's head. On the back of the cover the illustration is repeated, only with the withdrawn release's picture on the wall being replaced with that of the earlier Scared to Dance album. The track "Pros and Cons" is removed, and "Masquerade", also released as a single, is added.

Track listing

1980 re-release

Personnel 

 Skids

 Richard Jobson – vocals
 Stuart Adamson – guitar, vocals, keyboards
 William Simpson – bass guitar, vocals

 Additional personnel

 Rusty Egan – drums
 Bill Nelson – keyboards
 Thomas Kellichan – drums on "Masquerade" (second version only)

References

External links 

 

Skids (band) albums
1979 albums
Virgin Records albums
Albums recorded at Rockfield Studios